Dr. Melynda J. Price is the Robert E. Harding, Jr. Professor of Law and the Director of the African American and Africana Studies Program in the College of Arts and Sciences at the University of Kentucky. Her research focuses on race, gender and citizenship, the politics of punishment and the role of law in the politics of race and ethnicity in and bordering the U.S.

In 2008, the Ford Foundation awarded her a Diversity Postdoctoral Fellowship. She writes for the New York Times.

Bibliography 

 2015: At the Cross: Race, Religion and Citizenship in the Politics of the Death Penalty (Oxford University Press)
 2009: Performing Discretion or Discrimination: Race, Ritual, and Peremptory Challenges in Capital Jury Selection, Michigan Journal of Race and Law
 2008: Balancing Lives: Individual Accountability and the Death Penalty as Punishment for Genocide (Lessons from Rwanda), Emory International Law Journal
 2006: Litigating Salvation: Race, Religion, and Innocence in the Cases of Karla Faye Tucker and Gary Graham, Southern California Review of Law and Social Justice

Professional memberships 

 Texas Bar Association
 American Association of Law School
 Law and Society Association
 American Political Science Association
 National Conference of Black Political Scientists
 Association for the Study of African American Life and History
 Berkshire Conference of Women Historians

References

External links 

 Dr. Price's faculty profile
 Price's blog "Thoughts of an Ivory Tower Interloper"

American women legal scholars
American legal scholars
African-American legal scholars
American women academics
African-American women lawyers
University of Kentucky faculty
Prairie View A&M University alumni
University of Texas alumni
University of Michigan alumni
Activists from Kentucky
21st-century American women writers
African-American women in politics
21st-century African-American writers
21st-century African-American women writers
Year of birth missing (living people)
Living people